Theodore may refer to:

Places
 Theodore, Alabama, United States
 Theodore, Australian Capital Territory
 Theodore, Queensland, a town in the Shire of Banana, Australia
 Theodore, Saskatchewan, Canada
 Theodore Reservoir, a lake in Saskatchewan

People
 Theodore (given name), includes the etymology of the given name and a list of people
 Theodore (surname), a list of people

Fictional characters
 Theodore "T-Bag" Bagwell, on the television series Prison Break
 Theodore Huxtable, on the television series The Cosby Show

Other uses
 Theodore (horse), a British Thoroughbred racehorse
 Theodore Racing, a Formula One racing team

See also
 Principality of Theodoro, a principality in the south-west Crimea from the 13th to 15th centuries
 Thoros (disambiguation), Armenian for Theodore
 James Bass Mullinger, a 19th-century author who used "Theodorus" as a pen name